Stefanos Korkolis (born 12 September 1960) is a Greek composer and pianist. He has performed in theaters and auditoriums all around the world, including the Concertgebouw, the Belém Cultural Center (Portugal and Brazil), the Royal Theater Carré, the Athens Concert Hall, the Thessaloniki Concert Hall, and the Odeon of Herodes Atticus.

Early life 
Stefanos was born in Athens and showed a passion for music in his early youth. At the age of 4, although unaware of musical notation, he had the ability of memorizing pieces of classical music with great ease and reproducing them on the piano almost intact. He began his studies at the Athens Conservatoire under the guidance of  the late Marika Papaioannou and the instruction of Phoebe Vallinda. After receiving his diploma in piano, he traveled to Paris to continue his studies – thanks to a fellowship from the French government – next to internationally renowned pianist Yvonne Lefébure. He simultaneously attended courses in composition, orchestration, conducting and cinema music. These included classes by Pierre Boulez, Astor Piazzolla and other acclaimed music masters.

While in Paris, Stefanos became acquainted with famous Argentinian pianist, Martha Argerich and was joined by ties of friendship and mutual artistic appreciation. It was thanks to Martha that Stefanos dream to meet the great Vladimir Horowitz came true. In his short apprenticeship with Horowitz, Stefanos learned about the true value of music as well as techniques that only a master of that caliber could transfuse. By that time Stefanos completed his studies at the Conservatoire de Paris and the École Normale de Musique de Paris he achieved the first prize for modern ballet composition at the Val-de-Marne International Music Festival. He kept on performing around the world with a repertory consisting mainly of his own works as well as works by great Russian composers, such as Alexander Scriabin and Sergei Prokofiev. His performances were received with much enthusiasm and received excellent critiques, which continue until today.

Career

International collaborations 
Stefanos had the pleasure of working with some of the greatest singers, singing his own music. His worldwide collaborations include: Alfredo Kraus, José Carreras, Teresa Berganza, Dulce Pontes, Lucio Dalla, Luca Carboni, Vittorio Grigolo and others. During his collaboration with the famous Portuguese artist Dulce Pontes touring around the world since 2003 and being her permanent conductor, orchestrator and pianist, he also had the pleasure of working with Academy Award Winner Ennio Morricone and Horacio Ferrer, Astor Piazzolla's poet.

Greek collaborations 
Some of Stefanos important collaborations are with Vicky Leandros and Nana Mouskouri. He also collaborated with various important artists in Greece like Dimitra Galani, Alkistis Protopsalti, Mario Frangoulis, George Dalaras, Dimitris Mitropanos, Marinella, Antonis Remos, Sakis Rouvas, Maria Dimitriadi, George Perris and others.

He wrote music for the play "Theodora", directed by the memorable Michael Cacoyannis (known for the movie Zorba the Greek). He also wrote the music for the film of Michael Cacoyannis'  "Up, down and sideways." During a period of seven years, the period of his "musical adolescence" as Stefanos often refers to, without giving up the classical concerts, he included modern Greek music in his activities, first as arranger – composer and then as a performer of his own compositions, winning multiple platinum albums and performing in front of packed stadiums in Greece, Cyprus and Italy.

Orchestra and auditoriums
He has collaborated with orchestras such as the Prague Philharmonic Orchestra, the Bulgarian National Radio Symphony Orchestra, the Warsaw National Philharmonic Orchestra, the Leipzig Gewandhaus Orchestra, the Orchestra Mozart and others. He has performed under the baton of acclaimed conductors such as Vladimír Válek, Valeri Vatchev, Alexander Myrat, Dimitris Agrafiotis, Nick Tshouchlos, Simeon Cogan and others.

He has performed in great theaters and auditoriums all around the world, like the Concertbaum (Netherlands), the Opera de la Corunia, the Centro Cultural de Belem (Portugal and Brazil), the Carre Theatre of Amsterdam and of course the Athens Concert Hall, the Thessaloniki Concert Hall, and the Odeon Herodus Atticus. He was invited to perform at José Carreras' gala in Leipzig. He also composed the Russian Air Force Anthem that he performed in Kremlin for the celebration of the 85th anniversary of the Federal Air Transport Agency under permission by the Dmitri Shostakovich family for the transcription for piano and orchestra of Shostakovitch's work, the Concertino for two pianos.

Stefanos is the official ambassador of Mikis Theodorakis' music in Greece and abroad. In May 2017, at the request of Mikis Theodorakis, he presented symphonic works of the latter, in Cologne, in the presence of the composer himself, and on 1 September 2017, Stefanos once again appeared at the Herodes Atticus theatre, in the framework of a charity concert to support the Association of Friends of Children with Cancer "ELPIDA", next to Maria Farantouri and Sofia Manousaki.

Special Olympics 
He has composed the Special Olympics' Anthem and also the song of the Union "Mazi gia to pedi – Together for the child", for charity purposes of which Stefanos gave a concert in September 2012 at the Odeon of Herodes Atticus (Athens Herodion). The concert had an enormous success and the revenues, which reached the amount of 153,000 euros, were distributed entirely to 10 clubs of the Union.

Other projects 
Stefanos finished his last project abroad entitled «Bloody Faeries», a production of legendary British producer Haydn Bendall and he continues to give concerts in Greece and worldwide as a soloist in recitals and in collaboration with famous orchestras. The most recent concert he gave was at the Chopin Academy of Music in Warsaw, in January 2014, where Stefanos presented for the first time his new "discovery" Sophia Manousaki, a very young and talented singer of the new generation, in front of a very demanding audience, winning rave reviews.

On 27 August 2014, Stefanos and Sophia Manousaki launched the brand new institution "Αrt in the square» at the Cyprus Limassol Marina, in front of a large audience. Also, on September 5, 2014 Stefanos participated with huge success, in the charity concert "sing me an angel", which took place at the Odeon of Herodes Atticus (Athens Herodion), in collaboration with the internationally renowned tenor Mario Frangoulis and Norwegian soprano Sissel, under the direction of conductor, Richard Balcombe. Finally, on 13 September 2014 he participated in the Russian-Cypriot charity gala, which took place in the gardens of the Presidential Palace in Cyprus.

In May 2015, the new album of Stefanos, entitled "Sinantisi / the Meeting" was released in Greece and Cyprus. In this double CD, for the first time Stefanos, as a piano soloist, touches pieces from all over the musical spectrum of the great Greek composer Mikis Theodorakis, such as preludes for piano, adaptations / arrangements of orchestral pieces for piano and of course, lyrical songs, which were interpreted by the talented young singer Sophia Manousaki.

From the first days of the release, the double CD received excellent reviews and on 17 October 2015, the award ceremony of the gold disc, took place  at the Athens Concert Hall, with the presence of Mikis Theodorakis, who, after the ceremony and the concert, and while the audience was giving Stefanos a standing ovation, said: What happened today means a new beginning for my music, I owe this new beginning to Stefanos Korkolis, who is, first of all, an important and great composer and it is a heavy responsibility for a composer to recognize the value of another composer. This never happens! Only Liszt did this and he was the only one. Stefanos shows his love and devotion to my music not only through words but also through his acts. When he plays piano, he combines Apollo and Dionysus. From one moment to another he can become Apollo or Dionysus. This is very difficult. It makes you feel the light !".

Already this concert entitled "Sinantisi" has traveled in twenty cities across Greece, achieving a huge success. All the concerts were sold out and in some cities the concerts were repeated because of the excessive attendance of the world. Everywhere the reviews were dithyrambic. Many people consider the tour "Sinantisi" by Mikis Theodorakis, Stefanos Korkolis and Sophia Manousaki as the success of this year's winter

Also, the song "Thes" from the album entitled Pes mou t' alithina sou in lyrics of Rebecca Roussi and music of Stefanos Korkolis, which was sung in a unique way by Dimitris Mitropanos, thanks to a tasteful TV spot, came back to the news scoring a  great success 11 years, after it was released, so it gained the hearts of all Greek people and conquered the first positions even in the international charts.

In November 2016, the project "Sinantisi" was presented in Paris, at the Alambra Theatre, where it received an enormous success from the French public. Immediately afterwards took place two sold out concerts at the bookstore "IANOS", where Stefanos and Sophia Manousaki presented the new double CD entitled Synantisi II" which includes, at first nationwide release, the circle of songs entitled "A sea full of music" in poetry by Dimitra Manda, as well as the circle of songs entitled "Chairetismoi" in poetry of Giannis Theodorakis, Angeliki Eleftheriou and Mikis Theodorakis. These two circle of songs belong to the circle "'Betrayed Projects" by great Greek composer Mikis Theodorakis. This double CD, also, received excellent reviews and on January 16, 2017, the award ceremony of the gold disc, took place  at the bookstore IANO".

Stefanos continues the concerts all over Greece and abroad while in April 2018, was released his new album, a double cd entitled "I should like to relate this memory" which includes songs and orchestral works inspired by Constantine P. Cavafy's poems.

Discography
 1987 – Το Μαγικό Κλειδί
 1988 – Λες Κι Είσαι Νύχτα
 1989 – Πίπερο
 1991 – Γι' Αυτό Σου Λέω Πάμε (Ζωντανή Ηχογράφηση Από Το Taboo)
 1991 –  Οι Μέρες Της Φωτιάς
 1992 – Με Τη Φωνή Του Φεγγαριού
 1993 – Εφ' Όλης Της Ύλης
 1994 – Χαμένες Ατλαντίδες 
 1995 – Έχω Μια Διαίσθηση
 1996 – Ξέσπασα...
 1997 – Ανοιχτές Σελίδες

References

Living people
Greek classical musicians
Greek pianists
Greek songwriters
Greek pop musicians
1960 births
21st-century pianists
Musicians from Athens